Imani-Lara Lansiquot (born 17 December 1997) is an English sprinter who competes mainly in the 100 metres. She finished fourth in the 100 metres finals at both the 2016 IAAF World U20 Championships and the 2017 European U23 Championships. In the 4 × 100 metres relay, she won a gold medal at the 2018 European Championships, silver at the 2019 World Championships (where she ran in the heats but not the final), and bronze at the 2020 Tokyo Olympics. Her 100 metres best of 11.09 secs, ranks her fourth on the UK all-time list.

Career
Born in Peckham, Lansiquot first ran inside 12 seconds for the 100 metres as a 15-year-old, winning the Surrey Schools Championships in 11.98 in June 2013 and winning the English Schools Championships in 11.91 in July 2013.

Lansiquot ran 11.56 secs in her heat at the 2015 European Junior Championships, before going on to finish fifth in the final in 11.74. She then won a gold medal in the 4 × 100 metres relay. The following year, she ran 11.17 secs in her heat at the 2016 World U20 Championships, to move to second on the UK under 20 all-time list behind Dina Asher-Smith (11.14 in 2014). She finished fourth in the final with 11.37 secs. She also finished fourth in the 100 metres final at the 2017 European U23 Championships in 11.58.

At the 2018 Anniversary Games in London, Lansiquot ran a season's best of 11.19 secs in her heat, before improving her personal best to 11.11 in the final, to move to sixth on the UK all-time list. She ranks eighth on the UK all-time 60 metres list with 7.21 secs (2018).

In August 2018 at the European Championships in Berlin, Lansiquot finished sixth in the 100 metres final in 11.14 secs, before winning a gold medal in the 4 × 100 metres relay.

Lansiquot improved her 100 metres best to 11.09 secs on 30 June 2019, to move to fourth on the UK all-time list.

At the 2019 World Championships in Doha, she reached the 100 metres semi-finals and ran 11.35 secs, having run 11.31 to qualify as a fastest loser from the preliminary round. She went on to win a silver medal in the 4 × 100m relay, where she ran in the heats before having to withdraw from the final due to injury.

In 2020 she became British champion when winning the 100 metres event at the 2020 British Athletics Championships with a time of 11.26 sec.

Personal life
Lansiquot studied psychology at King's College London. She is of Saint Lucian descent through her father. She is named after the Trinidadian cricketer Brian Lara.

International competitions

References

External links

1997 births
Living people
People from Peckham
Athletes from London
English female sprinters
British female sprinters
English people of Saint Lucian descent
World Athletics Championships athletes for Great Britain
World Athletics Championships medalists
European Athletics Championships winners
British Athletics Championships winners
Alumni of King's College London
Black British sportswomen
Athletes (track and field) at the 2020 Summer Olympics
Medalists at the 2020 Summer Olympics
Olympic bronze medallists for Great Britain
Olympic bronze medalists in athletics (track and field)
Olympic athletes of Great Britain
20th-century British women
21st-century British women
Athletes (track and field) at the 2022 Commonwealth Games
Commonwealth Games silver medallists for England
Commonwealth Games medallists in athletics
Medallists at the 2022 Commonwealth Games